Andy Blunden (born 11 October 1945) is an Australian writer and Marxist philosopher based in Melbourne.

Biography 
Blunden is a member and secretary of the Marxists Internet Archive Collective (or Marxists.org), a website which contains many Marxist and Marxist related text on history, philosophy and politics along with many other topics.

Another internet project Blunden is involved with is the "Marx Myths & Legends". This website hosts many articles of prominent Marxian scholars and activists dealing with misunderstandings and slander surrounding Marx and his ideas.

His published works cover topics from Hegel to post-structuralism to ethics and politics. Blunden is a self-described "Hegelian Marxist with a 'pragmatist twist' using Lev Vygotsky."

Works

Books
Stalinism: Its Origin & Future. 1993.
Meaning of Hegel's Logic. 1997. | At Wikisource
For Ethical Politics. 2003.
 An Interdisciplinary Theory of Activity. Leiden: Brill, 2010 (hardback); Chicago: Haymarket Books, 2012 (paperback).
 Selected Writings on the Semiotics of Modernity. Erythros Press and Media, 2012.
 Concepts: A Critical Approach. Leiden: Brill, 2012 (hardback); Chicago: Haymarket Books, 2014 (paperback).
 Collaborative Projects. An Interdisciplinary Study. Leiden: Brill, 2014 (hardback); Chicago: Haymarket Books, 2016 (paperback).
 The Origins of Collective Decision Making. Leiden: Brill, 2016 (hardback); Chicago: Haymarket Books, 2017 (paperback).

Contributions
 "Foreword" to Georg Wilhelm Friedrich Hegel, Hegel's Logic: Being Part One of the Encyclopaedia of the Philosophical Sciences. [1830] Marxists Internet Archive Publications, 2009.

See also 
 Aleksei N. Leontiev
 Critical Psychology
 Cultural-Historical Activity Theory (CHAT)
 Cultural-historical psychology
 Kharkov School of Psychology
 Vygotsky Circle

References

External links 

 Andy Blunden's Home Page
 Transcript from ABC Radio National's "perspective" Ethical Politics
 The Blackwood Group
 Hegel: The First Cultural Psychologist Video from Vimeo

1945 births
Living people
20th-century Australian philosophers
21st-century Australian philosophers
Writers from Melbourne
Marxist theorists